Meliden Football Club is a Welsh football team based in Meliden, Denbighshire, Wales.  The team currently play in the North Wales Coast East Football League Premier Division, which is at the fourth tier of the Welsh football league system.

History
The club reformed for the 2007–08 season and initially joined the Clwyd Football League before gaining promotion to the Welsh Alliance League in 2012. They played seven seasons in Division Two, with their best finishing position being fifth in the first season.

In March 2019 the club announced that at the end of the 2018–19 season they would resign from the Welsh Alliance League and rejoin the Vale of Clwyd and Conwy Football League. They finished the 2019–20 season in sixth place in a season curtailed by the COVID-19 pandemic.

In 2020 the team was accepted into the Premier Division of the new North Wales Coast East Football League.

Honours

 Clwyd Football League Premier Division – Runners-up: 2011–12
 Clwyd Football League Division One - Runners-up: 2009–10
 Clwyd Cup – Winners: 2011–12
 Combination Cup – Winners: 2011–12

External links
Club official Twitter
Club official Facebook

References

Football clubs in Wales
Welsh Alliance League clubs
North Wales Coast Football League clubs
Sport in Denbighshire
Vale of Clwyd and Conwy Football League clubs
Clwyd Football League clubs